This is a list of diplomatic missions in the United Arab Emirates. There are currently 131 embassies in Abu Dhabi. Many other countries have diplomatic missions accredited from other capitals. many countries maintain consulates in other Emirati cities (not including honorary consulates).

Embassies in Abu Dhabi

Other posts 
 (Delegation)
 (Representative Office)
 (Representative office)

Consulates-General/Commercial offices in Dubai 

 (Economic office)

 

 (Consulate) 

 (Commercial Office)

 
 

 
 

 (Commercial Office)

 

 
 
 

 

 

 
 
 

 

 

 

 (Commercial Office)

 

 (Commercial Office)

Accredited embassies 

Resident in Doha, Qatar
 

 

 

Resident in Kuwait City, Kuwait

 
 

 

Resident in Riyadh, Saudi Arabia

 

 

 

Resident in elsewhere
 (Tehran)
 (Cairo)
 (Cairo)
   (Cairo)
 (London)
 (Cairo)

Embassies to open

See also 
 Foreign relations of the United Arab Emirates
 Visa requirements for United Arab Emirates citizens

References

External links 
 Foreign Embassies and Consulates in the UAE

List
United Arab Emirates
Diplomatic missions